Anastasia Kvitko (born 25 November 1994) is a Russian glamour model and entrepreneur.

Kvitko was born and raised in western Russia in the Kaliningrad Oblast (region) and moved to the United States in her late teen years. She first moved to Miami to pursue modeling. After a short time in Miami she then moved to Los Angeles to pursue modeling full-time. She is famous for her 112-63-118 figure (as of 2016).

After being turned down by multiple modeling agencies, instead of vowing to lose her curves, she has turned them into her trademark. Due to her figure and presence on social media, Kvitko, who had over 12.2 million Instagram followers as of 2017, was dubbed the 'Russian Kim Kardashian'. She has been disparaged by critics and followers who claim that she is deliberately modelling herself on reality star Kim Kardashian. She said in an interview: "I like Kim Kardashian but I don’t quite like being compared to her – she is far behind me. She also stated that she would surpass Kim Kardashian in the future."

See also
List of glamour models

References

External links
 Kvitko on Instagram 
 

1994 births
Living people
Glamour models
Russian female models
People from Kaliningrad